Advance Auto Parts, Inc. (Advance) is an American automotive aftermarket parts provider. Headquartered in Raleigh, North Carolina, it serves both professional installer and do it yourself (DIY) customers. As of July 13, 2019, Advance operated 4,912 stores and 150 Worldpac branches in the United States and Canada. The Company also serves 1,250 independently owned Carquest-branded stores across these locations in addition to Mexico, the Bahamas, Turks and Caicos and British Virgin Islands. The company retails various brand name, original equipment manufacturer (OEM) and private label automotive replacement parts, accessories, batteries and maintenance items for domestic and imported cars, vans, sport utility vehicles and light and heavy duty trucks.

History 

In April 1932, Arthur Taubman purchased the Advance Stores from Pep Boys, with two stores in Roanoke, Virginia and one in Lynchburg, Virginia.

The first major expansion of Advance Auto Parts was in 1998 when the company acquired the remaining operations of Western Auto, an auto parts and general store retailer.  Most of the Western Auto operations had been taken over by Sears, Roebuck and Co. in 1987.

In April 2001, Advance Auto Parts acquired Carport Auto Parts, a regional retail chain with 29 stores in Alabama and Mississippi.  On November 28, Advance acquired Discount Auto Parts, Inc., a regional auto parts chain with 671 stores in Florida, Alabama, Georgia, South Carolina, and Louisiana. Upon completion of this merger, Advance Auto Parts became a publicly traded company, listed as a common stock on the New York Stock Exchange under the symbol AAP.  The year ended with 2,484 stores in 38 states.

In July 2002, Advance Auto Parts received bankruptcy court approval to acquire 57 Trak Auto stores in northern Virginia, Washington, DC, and eastern Maryland.
In December 2012, Advance Auto Parts acquired BWP Distributors, a Carquest franchise for the New England region that included the transfer of 124 company owned retail locations plus 2 distribution centers. The responsibility for 92 independently owned location that were service by BWP were transferred to General Parts, Inc., the largest Carquest franchise along with one distribution center for servicing those locations.

On October 16, 2013, Advance Auto Parts entered into a definitive agreement to acquire General Parts International, Inc. (GPI), a privately held distributor and supplier of equipment and aftermarket replacement products for commercial markets operating under the Carquest and WorldPac brands. The deal created the largest automotive aftermarket parts provider in North America.

General Parts International, with corporate headquarters in Raleigh, NC, has seen a significant rise in personnel since being acquired by Advance. Most of these added jobs are personnel from Roanoke, Minnesota or between the now redundant GPI positions being transferred to Raleigh.

On September 30, 2015, Starboard Value LP, an activist investment firm disclosed a 3.7 percent stake in Advance Auto Parts. Effective January 2, 2016, Darren Jackson elected to resign his position as CEO. On April 4, 2016, Advance announced Frito-Lay North America CEO Tom Greco would succeed Jackson as CEO. While Advance stock declined throughout 2016 and 2017, the stock has seen a strong recovery as the company's five-year transformation plan progresses. In 2018, Advance was the #4 top performing stock of the S&P 500 outperforming the aftermarket automotive parts industry by more than 30 percent.

In October 2018, Advance and Walmart announced a strategic omnichannel partnership that will create an automotive specialty store on Walmart.com.

In November 2018, Advance Auto Parts announced the relocation of its headquarters from Roanoke, Virginia to Raleigh, North Carolina. The state of North Carolina and Advance Auto Parts agreed on a $12 million incentive package for this relocation.

On December 23, 2019, it was announced that Advance Auto Parts would be purchasing the DieHard battery brand from Sears. The deal was a $200 million all cash deal. To promote the acquisition and availability of the brand at Advance and Carquest, Advance hired actor Bruce Willis to be part of a promotional film in-character as John McClane from the film Die Hard, which was released during the 2020 holiday season.

In June 2021, Advance Auto Parts announced its purchase of Baxter Auto Parts, a chain with 29 stores located in Oregon, Washington, and California. The stores joined the Carquest brand that serves as Advance Auto Parts' brand in the Pacific states.

Motorsport sponsorships 
From 2009 to 2013, Advance Auto Parts was a title sponsor of Monster Jam and sponsored a truck on the circuit called the Advance Auto Parts Grinder. In 2023, Advance Auto Parts took over as the official sponsor of the checkered flag in IndyCar.

Advance Auto Parts has also served as a sponsor in NASCAR, where it is the official auto parts retailer of the sanctioning body. In 2017, the company sponsored the Advance Auto Parts Clash exhibition race at Daytona International Speedway, while it became the title sponsor of the NASCAR Advance Auto Parts Weekly Series in 2020. Advance Auto Parts has also partnered with individual teams, such as appearing on Alex Bowman's cars in 2015 and 2016 with Tommy Baldwin Racing and JR Motorsports, respectively.

In December 2016, it was announced that Advance would be the primary sponsor of NHRA Funny Car driver Courtney Force, the winningest female Funny Car driver in the history. The multi-year sponsorship began with the 2017 Circle K NHRA Winternationals in Pomona, California, and ran through the entire 2017 and 2018 seasons. Courtney Force announced she was stepping away from drag racing in January 2019 and later it was announced that her sister, Brittany Force, and her Top Fuel dragster would be sponsored by Advance for the 2019 NHRA season.

Today sponsorships include Team Penske with driver Ryan Blaney in NASCAR and Josh Hart (racer), representing Advance's TechNet Professional brand in the Top Fuel class of NHRA.

Ownership
As of 2018, Advance Auto Parts shares are mainly held by institutional investors like The Vanguard Group, BlackRock, State Street Corporation, and others.

Recognition
Advance premiered on the Fortune 500 list of companies in 2003 at No. 466 and has remained on the list since that time, including ranking No. 326 on the 2019 list.

As of June 2014, it was ranked at No. 1,412 on the Forbes "World's Biggest Public Companies" list. Soon after, Advance Auto Parts was bumped to 2nd largest automotive aftermarket retailer by competitor, AutoZone, and has held that that position as of July 2018.

In January 2005, Advance was named the “Best Managed Company in America” in the retail sector by Forbes magazine. This recognition was part of the annual Forbes Platinum 400 list of top-performing big corporations. The best-managed companies are those businesses that top the rankings in 26 different industries.

See also

CarParts.com
 AutoZone
 Carquest
 National Automotive Parts Association (NAPA)
 O'Reilly Auto Parts
 Pep Boys
 SCO v. AutoZone

References

External links 

Companies listed on the New York Stock Exchange
American companies established in 1932
Retail companies established in 1932
Automotive part retailers of the United States
Companies based in Raleigh, North Carolina
1932 establishments in Virginia
2001 initial public offerings